Frankfurt (Oder) – Oder-Spree is an electoral constituency (German: Wahlkreis) represented in the Bundestag. It elects one member via first-past-the-post voting. Under the current constituency numbering system, it is designated as constituency 63. It is located in eastern Brandenburg, comprising the independent city of Frankfurt (Oder) and the district of Oder-Spree.

Frankfurt (Oder) – Oder-Spree was created for the inaugural 1990 federal election after German reunification. Since 2021, it has been represented by Mathias Papendieck of the Social Democratic Party (SPD).

Geography
Frankfurt (Oder) – Oder-Spree is located in eastern Brandenburg. As of the 2021 federal election, it comprises the independent city of Frankfurt (Oder) and the district of Oder-Spree.

History
Frankfurt (Oder) – Oder-Spree was created after German reunification in 1990, then known as Frankfurt (Oder) – Eisenhüttenstadt – Beeskow. It acquired its current name in the 2002 election. In the 1990 through 1998 elections, it was constituency 279 in the numbering system. In the 2002 and 2005 elections, it was number 63. In the 2009 election, it was number 64. Since the 2013 election, it has been number 63.

Originally, the constituency comprised the independent cities of Frankfurt (Oder) and Eisenhüttenstadt and the districts of Beeskow and Landkreis Eisenhüttenstadt. It acquired its current configuration and borders in the 2002 election.

Members
The constituency was first represented by Ulrich Junghanns of the Christian Democratic Union (CDU) from 1990 to 1994. Winfried Mante of the Social Democratic Party (SPD) was elected in 1994 and served until 2002, followed by Jörg Vogelsänger from 2002 to 2009. Thomas Nord of The Left won the constituency in 2009, but was defeated in 2013. Martin Patzelt of the CDU served as representative from 2013 to 2021, when Mathias Papendieck regained it for the SPD.

Election results

2021 election

2017 election

2013 election

2009 election

References

Federal electoral districts in Brandenburg
1990 establishments in Germany
Constituencies established in 1990